Melanie Oudin was the defending champion, but chose to compete at the 2013 Tevlin Women's Challenger instead.

Anna Tatishvili won the title, defeating Elitsa Kostova in the final, 6–4, 6–4.

Seeds

Main draw

Finals

Top half

Bottom half

References 
 Main draw

John Newcombe Women's Pro Challenge - Singles